The Aleut Restitution Act of 1988 (also known as the Aleutian and Pribilof Islands Restitution Act) was a reparation settlement passed by the United States Congress in 1988, in response to the internment of Aleut people living in the Aleutian Islands during World War II.

Before the Japanese invasion of Attu and Kiska in 1942, the United States forcibly relocated some 800 Aleuts to camps in Southeast Alaska, where it is estimated that more than 1 in 10 evacuees perished.

Proposal of the Aleutian and Pribilof Restitution Act (1987)
The bill was introduced on January 6, 1987, by Representative Thomas S. Foley (D-WA), along with 166 co-sponsors. It declared the following:
The Aleut civilian residents of certain islands who were relocated during World War II remained relocated long after any potential danger had passed.
The United States failed to provide reasonable care for the Aleuts, resulting in illness, disease, and death, and failed to protect Aleut personal and community property.
The United States has not compensated the Aleuts adequately.
There is no remedy for injustices suffered by the Aleuts except an Act of Congress.

Under the new bill, a trust fund was established to be used "for the benefit of the following people and purposes":
The elderly, disabled, or seriously ill
Students in need of scholarship assistance
Preservation of Aleut cultural heritage and historical records
The improvement of community centers in affected Aleut villages, and
Other purposes to improve Aleut life.

For each eligible Aleut, $12,000 was paid to compensate for any personal property losses sustained during the war.

Amendment to the Aleutian and Pribilof Restitution Act (1993)
On September 14, 1993, an amendment was proposed to the original 1988 Restitution Act, increasing authorization for payments from $1,400,000 to $4,700,000, in order to include church property damaged or lost during the war. The bill was passed by the House of Representatives and the Senate, and the Act was amended on October 5, 1994.

See also
Aleut
Aleutian Islands
 Outline of United States federal Indian law and policy

References

100th United States Congress
103rd United States Congress
1988 in Alaska
1994 in Alaska
Alaska Natives and United States law
Aleut
Native American history of Alaska
Reparations
United States federal Native American legislation